Darenjan may refer to:
 Darenjan, Fars
 Darenjan, Firuzabad, Fars Province
 Darenjan-e Lor, Firuzabad County, Fars Province
 Darenjan, Kerman